Below are the squads for the 2013 COSAFA Cup, which took place from 6 July to 20 July 2013.  The player's age and clubs are as of the opening day of the tournament.  Players marked (c) were named as captain for their national team for the tournament.

Angola
For the development of Angola's Olympic team, all players for this tournament are under-23.

Head coach:  Gustavo Ferrín

Botswana
Head coach:  Stanley Tshosane

Kenya
Head coach:  Adel Amrouche

Lesotho
Head coach:  Leslie Notši

Malawi
Head coach:  Tom Saintfiet

Mauritius
Head coach:  Akbar Patel

Mozambique
Head coach:  João Chissano

Namibia
Head coach:  Ricardo Mannetti

Seychelles
Head coach:  Jan Mak

South Africa
Head coach:  Gordon Igesund

Swaziland
Head coach:  Valerie Billen

Zimbabwe
Head coach:  Klaus Pagels

Zambia
Head coach:  Hervé Renard

References

COSAFA Cup squads